Emilio de los Santos (born October 12, 1903 San Juan de la Maguana) was a Dominican politician who served as President of the Dominican Republic from September 1963 to December 1963.

Career 
In 1963, he served as President of Electoral college and selected as President of the Dominican Republic and in December 1963, he resigned.

References 

Presidents of the Dominican Republic
Year of death missing
1903 births